Markus Schroth (born 25 January 1975) is a German former professional footballer who played as a centre-forward.

Club career
Schroth started to play football at the TSV Reichenbach, nearby Waldbronn, whence moving to Karlsruher SC at the age of 15. He started his professional career in 1994–95, and made his first division debut as a second-half substitute in the club's 0–1 loss at Eintracht Frankfurt, on 7 October 1994. It was his sole appearance of the campaign, and he amassed only four more in the following season, although he netted in another away fixture, a 3–0 success against SC Freiburg, on 13 April 1996.

Schroth eventually became a regular for KSC, making his UEFA Cup debut in a 0–1 loss at FC Rapid Bucharest (one minute played), and appearing in all the matches during 1997–98, scoring six goals, as Karlsruhe was eventually relegated.

He then joined TSV 1860 Munich in the summer of 1998, becoming an important offensive element from the start. In 2002–03, Schroth scored a career-best 14 goals, notably a hat-trick at FC Hansa Rostock, on 25 January 2003, and two goals in each venue against Energie Cottbus. However, 1860 Munich was relegated in the following season.

In the summer of 2004, Schroth signed a three-year contract with 1. FC Nürnberg. In his first two seasons with the club, he made 52 Bundesliga appearances in which he managed to score eleven goals. He made a good start in 2006–07, scoring two goals in the opening two matches, while also helping the side to that season's cup. On 2 February 2007, he scored, assisted and was booked in Nürnberg's 3–0 home win against Bayern Munich, the first game with Ottmar Hitzfeld back in charge.

It was announced in April 2007 that Schroth returned to TSV, after agreeing on a two-year contract, however he did not play one single match during his two-year spell and retired at the end of the 2008–09 season.

International career
Between 1996 and 1998, Schroth was a member of the Germany under-21s, winning 20 international caps and scoring five goals. He also appeared six times for the nation's B side, scoring once.

In 2003, Schroth played two matches (one goal) for "Team 2006", a squad made of players being watched for a possible selection for the 2006 FIFA World Cup, but would not finally make the cut.

Career statistics

Club

Honours

Club
1. FC Nürnberg
 DFB-Pokal: 2006–07

References

External links
  
 

1975 births
Living people
German footballers
Karlsruher SC II players
Karlsruher SC players
TSV 1860 Munich players
1. FC Nürnberg players
Germany under-21 international footballers
Germany B international footballers
Association football forwards
Bundesliga players
Footballers from Karlsruhe